The BMW M78 is an overhead valve straight-six petrol engine which was produced from 1933 to 1950. It is the first straight-6 automobile engine produced by BMW, an engine layout which has been a key feature of the brand for many years since.

The M78 was launched in the 1933 BMW 303. In 1936, the higher performance BMW M328 straight-six engine began to be produced alongside the M78. In 1952, the BMW M337 engine was introduced as the replacement to the M78. Compared with the M78, the M337 has a revised cylinder head, a new inlet manifold and a reinforced crankshaft with bigger, more modern bearings.

Design 
The M78 was designed by Rudolf Schleicher as a medium power straight-6 engine. Initial versions of the M78 had the same bore and stroke as the BMW 3/20's four-cylinder engine. The M78 has two main cast pieces, the iron cylinder block, and the reverse-flow cylinder head, also made from iron. The oilpan, and the cylinder head cover are made from pressed steel. In addition to that, the M78 has a pressed-steel cover for the chain that drives the in-block camshaft. Both the crankshaft, and the camshaft have four bearings. The camshaft also drives the shaft for the oil pump and the ignition distributor. The engine has overhead valves that are actuated through pushrods and rocker arms. The water pump is flange-mounted to the cylinder head, and powered by a belt that is driven by a pulley that is flanged to the crankshaft. The belt also powers the alternator. The spark plugs are installed almost horizontally, below the intake manifold. BMW installed two horizontal draught Solex 26 mm carburettors next to the engine block and flange-mounted them to the intake manifold that sits atop them, i.e. the carburettors "hang down" from the intake manifold.

Models

303 version 

Applications:
 1933-1934 303

315 version 
The compression ratio remained at 5.6:1. This engine produces  at 4000 rpm.

Applications:
 1934-1937 315

315/1 version 
An upgraded version of the 315 engine with the compression ratio increased to 6.8:1 and using three Solex carburetors. This version produces  at 4000 rpm.

Applications
 1934-1937 315/1

319 version 
This engine produces  at 3750 rpm.

Applications:
 1935-1937 319
 1937 329

319/1 version 
This engine produces  at 4000 rpm.

Applications:
 1935-1937 319/1

326 version 
Twin  Solex carburetors were used. The compression ratio was raised to 6.0:1. This engine produces  at 3750 rpm.

Applications:
 1936-1946 326
 1938-1950 321

320 version 
The 326 engine was detuned (by using a single carburetor) for the 320 and 321. This engine produces  at 3750 rpm.

Applications:
 1937-1938 320
 1938-1941 321

327 version 

Applications:
 1937-1955 327
 1949-1953 340

See also 
 BMW
 List of BMW engines

References

M78
Straight-six engines
Gasoline engines by model